SBS 4 was a geostationary communications satellite designed and manufactured by Hughes (now Boeing) on the HS-376 platform. It was ordered by Satellite Business Systems, which later sold it to Hughes Communications. It had a Ku band payload and operated at 94°W longitude.

Satellite description 
The spacecraft was designed and manufactured by Hughes on the HS-376 satellite bus.

History 

On August 30, 1984, SBS 4 was launched by Space Shuttle Discovery in the mission STS-41D from Kennedy Space Center at 12:41:50 UTC. The satellite was launched along with the satellites Telstar 302 and Leasat 2.

On 29 September 2005, SBS 4 was finally decommissioned and put into a graveyard orbit.

References

See also 

 1984 in spaceflight

Communications satellites
1984 in spaceflight
Satellites using the HS-376 bus